The King of Blaze  (Chinese: 火王 Huǒwáng, "Fire King") is a 2018 Chinese television series based on the Taiwanese manhua of the same name. It stars Chen Bolin and Jing Tian with Zhang Yijie and Lai Yumeng.

The series will be separated into two different parts; the first part (火王之破晓之战) will be set in the ancient era and Tang Dynasty while the second part (火王之千里同风) will be set in the modern era. It is set to air on Hunan TV starting November 26, 2018.

Synopsis

Part one
Thousands of years ago, there was a beautiful planet amongst the stars protected by six different deities of different elements. During a battle with dark forces, the deities suffer a huge blow and Qian Mei sacrificed herself to save her lover, Zhong Tian. In order to save their homeland, Zhong Tian travels to the glorious age of Tang Dynasty where he meets an astronomer named Feng Jian who looks exactly like his long-lost love. Feng Jian is revealed to be Qian Mei, and the couple eventually reunites. However, they face even bigger danger as the dark forces follow them to the mortal realm. It was discovered that the mastermind behind the dark forces is Di Yun, Zhong Tian's former close friend. Zhong Tian must contend against the countervailing forces of kinship, friendship and love to save his planet.

Part two 
Lin Ye is a young scientist who was inspired by the legend of the "King of Blaze". He gathered a group of young entrepreneurs and established an eco green group to research more about environmental protection and new energy sources. He meets Tong Feng, a female reporter, through an interview; and they work together to promote environmental conservation. However, Lin Ye's old friend Di Yun appears and uses underhanded means to interfere and steal his fruit of labors. Lin Ye and Tong Feng must work together to recover their efforts.

Cast (Part 1)

Main

Supporting

Tang Dynasty

Deities

Cast (Part 2)

Part two

Production
Part 1 of the series was filmed from June to August 2017 in Iceland, Xiangshan and Yinchuan.

Part 2 of the series was filmed from August to November in Hangzhou and Iceland.

Broadcast

Ratings

Premiere

Soundtrack

Part 1

References

External links

Chinese romance television series
Chinese fantasy television series
Chinese historical television series
Chinese science fiction television series
Hunan Television dramas
2018 Chinese television series debuts
Television shows based on manhua
Television series by Mango Studios
Television series by EE-Media